Libníkovice is a municipality and village in Hradec Králové District in the Hradec Králové Region of the Czech Republic. It has about 200 inhabitants.

Administrative parts
Villages of Borovice and Horní Černilov are administrative parts of Libníkovice.

References

External links

Villages in Hradec Králové District